Pierre Reymond (1513-1584) was a French enamelist.

Reymond managed a large workshop in Limoges, where one of his disciples was Pierre Courteys. As was the practice of the time, pieces produced in his workshop bore his initials even though they were not necessarily his work. He specialized in tableware decorated with mythological scenes including cups, plates, bowls, and dishes.

Reymond also made the enamelled altarpiece commissioned by Anne de Montmorency for the chapel of his Château d'Écouen.

The Petit Palais in Paris, France has a display of one of Reymond's work.

References

1513 births
1584 deaths
French enamellers
16th-century enamellers
16th-century French painters
Limoges enamel